Ryan Duthie (born September 2, 1974) is a Canadian retired professional ice hockey centre who played in North American minor leagues and in Europe.

Career
Duthie played Junior hockey for Spokane Chiefs of the WHL. He played for the Chiefs for 3 seasons, totaling 270 points in 198 games. During his final season with the Chiefs, Duthie was named to the Western Conference All-Star team. During his time with the Chiefs, Duthie was twice selected in the NHL Entry Draft; first in 1992 by the New York Islanders 105th overall, and again in 1994 by the Calgary Flames 91st overall.

Upon being drafted by the Flames, Duthie turned professional and reported to the clubs affiliate team, the Saint John Flames of the AHL. The following season, Duthie again played in the AHL, this time for the Adirondack Red Wings. During the 1996=97 season, Duthie played 4 games with the Minnesota Moose of the IHL, whilst focusing on playing with the Canadian National Team under coach Andy Murray.

For the 1997-98 season, Duthie moved to Finland, initially to play for Tappara, before moving on to Lukko, both of the SM-Liiga. Following his stint in Finland, Duthie moved to Italian side HC Merano for the 1998-99 season, playing in both Serie A and the Alpenliga.

Following a recommendation from then Los Angeles Kings head coach Andy Murray, Duthie moved to Great Britain to play for the London Knights; both the Kings and Knights were owned by Anschutz Entertainment Group. Duthie played 21 games for the Knights, and, following disagreements with coach Chris McSorley, was traded to the Manchester Storm in exchange for Rick Brebant. Duthie returned to Merano for the 2000-01 season, and stayed in Italy for the following season, playing for HC Milano.

Duthie then joined the WPHL's Fresno Falcons for the 2002-03 season, whilst also having a short stint in Germany for 2nd Bundesliga side EC Bad Nauheim. He returned to Serie A for the 2003-04 season, this time playing for the HC Pustertal, beforing finishing his career with the Oberliga side Heilbronner Falken.

International
During the 1996-97 Season Duthie was a member of the Canadian National Team who competed in competitions such as the Deutschland Cup, Spengler Cup and Sweden Hockey Games amongst others.

Career Statistics

Regular Season and Playoffs

International

Awards
 WHL West First All-Star Team – 1994

References

External links

1974 births
Adirondack Red Wings players
Calgary Flames draft picks
Canadian ice hockey centres
Fresno Falcons players
HC Merano players
Ice hockey people from Alberta
Living people
London Knights (UK) players
Lukko players
Manchester Storm (1995–2002) players
Manitoba Moose players
New York Islanders draft picks
Saint John Flames players
Spokane Chiefs players
Sportspeople from Red Deer, Alberta
Tappara players
Canadian expatriate ice hockey players in England
Canadian expatriate ice hockey players in Italy
Canadian expatriate ice hockey players in Finland